Tom McGregor is a Scottish curler.

At he national level, he is a two-time Scottisn men's champion and one-time Scottisn junior champion.

Teams

References

External links
 

Living people
Scottish male curlers
Scottish curling champions
Sportspeople from Hamilton, South Lanarkshire
Year of birth missing (living people)
Place of birth missing (living people)